U4/U6 small nuclear ribonucleoprotein Prp3 is a protein that in humans is encoded by the PRPF3 gene.

Function 

The removal of introns from nuclear pre-mRNAs occurs on complexes called spliceosomes, which are made up of 4 small nuclear ribonucleoprotein (snRNP) particles and an undefined number of transiently associated splicing factors. PRPF3 is one of several proteins that associate with U4 and U6 snRNPs.[supplied by OMIM]

Interactions 

PRPF3 has been shown to interact with DVL3.

References

Further reading

External links 
  GeneReviews/NIH/NCBI/UW entry on Retinitis Pigmentosa Overview

Spliceosome